The Old Farmhouse is a Grade II* listed pub which was originally a farmhouse, and dates back to at least 1560. It was rebuilt in 1611 and converted to its current usage in 1843. It is claimed to be the oldest building which is now a pub with a beer garden in Southampton, Hampshire.  It is situated adjacent to the Mount Pleasant level crossing on the South West Main Line.

History
The farmhouse, shown on the 1560 map of Southampton, was rebuilt in 1611, a date depicted in white bricks on the south wall, by an unknown person referred to in the surviving records as E.R.

Panton's Wareham Brewery took out a 1000-year lease on the property and opened a beer house here with Mrs. Annette Eddy listed as landlady in 1852. Scrase's Star Brewery took over the lease in 1892 followed later by Strong's Romsey Brewery.

Local Legends
The pub is reportedly haunted by the ghost of the daughter of an Irish family who got pregnant out-of-wedlock while living here. Former Landlord Barrie Short (now deceased) stated that although he didn't believe in the legend he had noticed that for a couple of days after he goes into the attic the jukebox will start playing strange music and the television will switch channels by itself. A skull, alleged to have been that of the girl, was unearthed in the cellar and used to be displayed behind the bar.

Other unconfirmed local legends state that Oliver Cromwell stayed at the farmhouse on one or two occasions and that smugglers' tunnels run from the fireplace to the nearby River Itchen.

Closure and reopening 
On 12 March 2019, the pub was voluntarily closed after a report by the Food Standards Agency gave it a food hygiene rating of 0 out of 5. The report found rat droppings behind the ice machine and the building was not ‘structurally sound’.

In July 2021, a revamp was underway ahead of a potential reopening in August 2021.

References

External links
Painting of the pub in 1830

Grade II* listed pubs in Hampshire
Pubs in Southampton
Reportedly haunted locations in South East England